Stoney's Extra Stout (Pig) is the eighth studio album by the Dead Milkmen. It was released by Restless Records in 1995. The Dead Milkmen had decided to break up prior to its release; the band (minus deceased bass player Dave Schulthise) would not record again until 2011's The King in Yellow. 

Several songs made it onto Death Rides a Pale Cow (A Collection), a greatest hits release from the band.

Critical reception
Trouser Press wrote: "Typical of the uninspired banality, the final track, 'Big Deal', opens with 'Life sucks then you die / And your soul gets sucked into the sky.' Meanwhile, your records go to the cutout bins." The A.V. Club called the album "justly forgotten."

Track listing 
 "Peter Bazooka" – 3:07
 "Train I Ride" – 2:48
 "The Girl with the Strong Arm" – 2:51
 "I’m Flying Away" – 2:49
 "Helicopter Interiors" – 1:44
 "The Blues Song" – 4:02
 "The Man Who Rides the Bus" – 3:32
 "Don’t Deny Your Inner Child" – 2:06
 "When I Get to Heaven" – 2:40
 "I Can’t Stay Awake" – 2:21
 "Crystalline" – 3:29
 "Chaos Theory" – 2:52
 "Khrissy" – 3:38
 "Like to Be Alone" – 2:44
 "Big Deal" – 3:07

References

1995 albums
The Dead Milkmen albums
Restless Records albums